Pickled radish, called chikin-mu ("chicken radish") in Korean, is a radish dish served and eaten with Korean fried chicken. Like other banchan, it is a free (and refillable, if not home-delivered) side dish in South Korea. 

Pickled radish in vinegar or salt, pronounced Dan-mu-ji in South Korean, is a banchan commonly served as a side dish in South Korea for its coolness and crunch. It can be divided into two types depending on whether it is served with chicken or jajangmyeon. It is also an abbreviation used to slander the other party in South Korea.

History 
Danmuji is a type of Japanese pickled food 'tsukemono' made by pickling radish. In the 17th century, pickled vegetables made by a monk named Takuang Soho (沢庵宗彭) of the Edo shogunate were exported to South Korea, centering on Buddhism, and were first popularized in South Korea after going through the Japanese colonial period. Even today, it is widely loved as an ingredient in various dishes or as a side dish.

Vinegar-marinated radish 
The vinegar-marinated radish, called Chicken-mu in South Korean, is a white cube-shaped side dish the size of an adult's thumbnail.  Usually, when the Korean-fried chicken is served, it is provided free of charge, but there are places that sell it for around 50 cents. In South Korea, The vinegar-marinated radish is served when eating Korean-fried chicken. Cube-shaped, crunchy vinegar- marinated radish is a cool, crisp substitute for celery sticks. Diced radishes are soaked in boiling water, vinegar, salt, and sugar for a day or so. Then refrigerate and serve.

Pickled yellow radish 
Pickled yellow radish is a naturally fermented salted food most commonly consumed in Asia. During the fermentation process, unique flavors and metabolites are created that promote the taste, aroma and texture of pickled yellow radish. In South Korea, pickled yellow radish slices are served when eating jajangmyeon, a black noodle dish. The round cylinder-shaped pickled radish is cut in half lengthwise and served thinly sliced. Simply put, it is half-moon shaped. Sprinkle with vinegar to enhance the sour taste. This is a free side dish that usually comes with the main dish at a Chinese-Korean restaurant that sells jajangmyeon. Pickled yellow radish, cut as thin and long as a child's little finger, is used in Gimbap, South Korea's representative food.

The inner meaning 
In Korea, 'pickled radish' is pronounced Dan-mu-ji. Made up of the first letters, this is an abbreviation of 'simple, ignorant, make a fuss', and is a word used when slandering or cursing the other person. When pronounced in Korean, simple is Dan-soon, ignorant is Mu-sik, and make a fuss has similar meanings to Ji-ral. By simply taking the first letter, Dan of Dan-mu-ji represents Dan-soon, Mu represents Mu-sik, and Ji represents Ji-ral.

See also 
 Dongchimi
 Takuan
 List of pickled foods

References 

Korean cuisine